Shariatpur Stadium is located by the Electricity Supply Substation, Shariatpur, Bangladesh.

See also
Stadiums in Bangladesh
List of cricket grounds in Bangladesh

References

Cricket grounds in Bangladesh
Football venues in Bangladesh
Shariatpur District